Patrick Armstrong may refer to:

Patrick Armstrong of Guildford Four and Maguire Seven
Patrick Armstrong, the name used by a fictional intelligence officer in the 1974 novel Spy Story by Len Deighton
Patrick Armstrong, character in the 1976 film Spy Story, based on the novel of the same name

See also